Craig Mallace (born 13 February 1985) is a Scottish former professional footballer and former Director of Camps & Youth Development for Minnesota United FC.

Early and personal life
Born in Torphichen, Scotland, Mallace played college soccer in the United States with the Milwaukee Panthers.

His younger brother Calum is also a footballer.

Career

Playing career
Mallace turned professional in 2006 when drafted by the Milwaukee Wave (MISL).  He was then signed for the Minnesota Thunder making 38 appearances for the Minnesota Thunder of the USL First Division through May 2009 before retiring due to injury.

Coaching career
After retiring as a professional player, Mallace became a director of coaching for several clubs in Twin Cities area of Minnesota. He was Director of Coaching for European Soccer Academy in New Jersey.  Upon returning to Minnesota, he was Director of Coaching for Cottage Grove United.

He was named Director of Camps & Youth Development for Minnesota United FC in February 2014, and was also the Assistant Coach for the Minnesota United Reserves.  He currently runs his own youth training company, and is the host on his weekly podcast.

References

1985 births
Living people
Scottish footballers
Minnesota Thunder players
USL First Division players
Scottish expatriate footballers
Expatriate soccer players in the United States
Association football midfielders
Association football defenders
Scottish expatriate sportspeople in the United States
People from Torphichen
Footballers from West Lothian